Pennsylvania Furnace Mansion, also known as the Lyon Mansion, is a historic home located at Franklin Township in Huntingdon County, Pennsylvania. It was built in 1834, and is a 2 1/2- to 4-story, "L"-shaped limestone dwelling in the Federal style.  The -story front facade features a center entrance framed by a transom and sidelights.  Also located on the property is a contributing privy.  The house was built as the ironmaster's mansion at Pennsylvania Furnace.

It was listed on the National Register of Historic Places in 1990.

References

External links

Houses on the National Register of Historic Places in Pennsylvania
Historic American Engineering Record in Pennsylvania
Federal architecture in Pennsylvania
Houses completed in 1834
Houses in Huntingdon County, Pennsylvania
National Register of Historic Places in Huntingdon County, Pennsylvania